La Corne is a municipality in the Canadian province of Quebec in Abitibi Regional County Municipality.

The place is named in honour of Louis de La Corne (1703–1761), a French naval officer who was wounded in the Battle of Sainte-Foy in 1760. Until 1978, the place name was incorrectly spelled as Lacorne.

From 1955 to 1965, La Corne was home to Canada's only lithium mine. With the advent of lithium batteries for electric cars and a myriad of consumer electronic products, the mine is currently being studied for reopening in late 2012 as an open-pit mine.

Demographics
Population trend:
 Population in 2011: 700 (2006 to 2011 population change: 2.6%)
 Population in 2006: 682
 Population in 2001: 629
 Population in 1996: 621
 Population in 1991: 616

Private dwellings occupied by usual residents: 283 (total dwellings: 404)

Mother tongue:
 English as first language: 1.5%
 French as first language: 98.5%
 English and French as first language: 0%
 Other as first language: 0%

Municipal council
 Mayor: Michel Lévesque
 Councillors: André Beauchemin, Éric Comeau, André Gélinas, Michel Larouche, Martin St-Pierre, Véronique Veilleux

References

Municipalities in Quebec
Incorporated places in Abitibi-Témiscamingue